The Navajo Nation presidential election of 2018 was held on Tuesday, November 6, 2018. The candidates for President of the Navajo Nation in the general election were Jonathan Nez and Joe Shirley, Jr. Jonathan Nez and running mate Myron Lizer won the election.  Although neither Nez nor Shirley were incumbents, they possessed the high name recognition associated with incumbents. 

The primary election was held on Tuesday, August 28, 2018 between 18 candidates for the office of Navajo Nation President.

Candidates

Advanced to general election 

 Joe Shirley, Jr. former Navajo Nation President (2003-2011), vying for a third term.
 Buu Nygren, USC student.
 Jonathan Nez, incumbent Vice-President of the Navajo Nation under Russell Begaye.
 Myron Lizer, entrepreneur of Fort Defiance, AZ/Coalmine, NM.

Eliminated in primary 

 Benny Bahe
 Russell Begaye, incumbent President of the Navajo Nation.
 Tom Chee, incumbent Council Delegate of the Shiprock Chapter.
 Calvin Lee, Jr.
 Vincent H. Yazzie
 Rex Lee Jim, former Vice-President of the Navajo Nation (2011-2015)
 Norman Patrick Brown
 Trudie Jackson
 Shawn Redd
 Alton Joe Shepherd
 Emily Ellison
 Tom Tso
 Kevin Cody
 Hope MacDonald Lonetree
 Nick X. Taylor
 Dineh Benally

Results
Jonathan Nez received 39,783 votes while Joe Shirley, Jr. received 20,146 votes.

A referendum for a salary increase for President and Vice-President did not pass with 37,693 votes against and 18,802 votes for.

References

External links
Jonathan Nez and Myron Lizer campaign website
Joe Shirley, Jr. and Buu Nygren campaign website

Navajo Nation presidential
Navajo Nation elections
Navajo Nation presidential
Navajo Nation presidential